Astle Park is an area of land in the countryside a mile or so south of Chelford in Cheshire in England, on the west side of the A535 road (Holmes Chapel Road) from Chelford to Jodrell Bank. It is sometimes used to hold events and shows: see List of steam fairs.

Henshaws Society for Blind People formerly owned Astle Park.

External links
Google Earth view of Astle Park

Parks and open spaces in Cheshire